Burbank is a surname. Notable people with the surname include:

 Albert Burbank (1902–1976), American Dixieland clarinet player
 Augustus Burbank (1823–1895), American physician
 Buzz Burbank, real name Michael J. Elston (born 1953), reporter for the Mike O'Meara Show
 Daniel C. Burbank (born 1961), American astronaut
 David Burbank (1821–1895), American dentist and real estate developer
 Elbridge Ayer Burbank (1858–1949), portrait painter of Native Americans
 Gary Burbank, American radio personality born Billy Purser in 1941
 James H. Burbank (1838–1911), Dutch soldier who fought in the American Civil War
 John A. Burbank (1827–1905), American businessman and fourth Governor of Dakota Territory
 Luke Burbank (born 1976), American podcaster and current host of Too Beautiful to Live
 Luther Burbank (1849–1926), American horticulturalist
 Nathaniel Burbank (1838–1901), American humorist, drama critic and newspaper editor
 Sidney Burbank (1807–1882), Union Army officer of the American Civil War
 Stephen B. Burbank, American professor at the University of Pennsylvania Law School

Fictional characters include:
 Carl Burbank, or Bushwacker (comics), a Marvel Comics villain
 Emil Burbank or Master Menace, a Marvel Comics villain
 Truman Burbank, main character in The Truman Show